John Sargent may refer to:

Politicians 
John Sargent (1714–1791), British Member of Parliament for West Looe and Midhurst
John Sargent (1750–1831), British Member of Parliament for Seaford, Bodmin and Queenborough
John Sargent (merchant) (1792–1874), Canadian merchant, farmer and politician in Nova Scotia
John Sargent (1799–1880), American politician in Massachusetts

Others 
John Sargent (Loyalist) (1750–1824), loyalist officer during the American Revolution
John Sargent (priest) (1780–1833), English clergyman, son of the MP for Seaford
John G. Sargent (1860–1939), U.S. Attorney General
John Singer Sargent (1856–1925), American portrait artist
John Turner Sargent Sr. (1924–2012), president and CEO of the Doubleday and Company publishing house
John Turner Sargent (born c. 1956), American publisher, CEO of Macmillan and Executive Vice President of the Holtzbrinck Publishing Group
John Neptune Sargent (1826–1893), commander of British troops in China, Hong Kong and the Straits Settlements
John Sargent, alter ego of fictional DC Comics character Sargon the Sorcerer c. 1941

See also
John Sergeant (disambiguation)